Donald Malinowski may refer to:

 Donald Malinowski (politician) (1924–2003), Catholic priest and politician in Manitoba, Canada
 Donald Malinowski (soccer), retired American soccer goalkeeper